Incheh-ye Qadim (also Romanized as Īncheh-ye Qadīm; also known as Īncheh-ye Kohneh) is a village in Qarah Quyun-e Jonubi Rural District, Qarah Quyun District, Showt County, West Azerbaijan Province, Iran. At the 2006 census, its population was 459, in 93 families.

References 

Populated places in Showt County